The year 631 BC was a year of the pre-Julian Roman calendar. In the Roman Empire, it was known as year 123 Ab urbe condita . The denomination 631 BC for this year has been used since the early medieval period, when the Anno Domini calendar era became the prevalent method in Europe for naming years.

Events
Cyrene, a Greek colony in present-day Libya, North Africa, is founded (approximate date).
Sadyattes becomes king of Lydia.

Births

Deaths

References